The Broken Spur is a 1921 American silent Western film directed by Ben F. Wilson and starring Jack Hoxie, Evelyn Nelson and Marin Sais.

Synopsis
An engineer attempts to construct a new railroad through the Canadian Northwest, facing opposition from a local bandit leader who fears the railroad will bring law and order to the area. Things are complicated by the fact that the two men are doppelgangers.

Cast
 Jack Hoxie as 'Silent' Joe Dayton/Jacques Durand
 Evelyn Nelson as 'Angel' Lambert
 Jim Welch as Bill Lambert
 Wilbur McGaugh as Pierre LeBac
 Edward W. Borman as John Dexter 
 Harry L. Rattenberry as Andy MacGregor
 Marin Sais as Ida Hunt

References

Bibliography
 Langman, Larry. A Guide to Silent Westerns. Greenwood Publishing Group, 1992.
 Munden, Kenneth White. The American Film Institute Catalog of Motion Pictures Produced in the United States, Part 1. University of California Press, 1997.

External links
 

1921 films
1921 Western (genre) films
1920s English-language films
Films directed by Ben F. Wilson
Arrow Film Corporation films
Films set in Canada
Silent American Western (genre) films
1920s American films